Raízen (pronounced Ha-ease-ain't) is the third largest Brazilian energy company by revenue and the fifth largest in Brazil. The company is a joint-venture formed in 2010 from the merger of the assets of sugar, fuel and ethanol derived from sugar from Cosan and Royal Dutch Shell in Brazil. The company has a market value of approximately US$20 Billion and a revenue of about US$28 billion.

After merging with Biosev, the company now has 35 ESB (ethanol, sugar, and bioenergy) plants, with a total crushing capacity of 105 million tonnes of sugar cane per year, while also boasting 3000 megawatts of installed electric power capacity produced from sugarcane biomass (bagasse). Many of these plants were inherited from Cosan at the creation of the joint-venture, while several others were acquired from competitors as part of an expansion strategy. In the fuel trade business, Raízen trades approximately 31 billion liters per year in both B2B (mainly the transportation and industrial sectors) and B2C segments (through its network of 7,000+ fuel stations across Brazil and Argentina). It aimed to certify just under 1 million hectares of affiliated sugarcane production area under the Bonsucro sustainability standard by 2020.

References 

Biofuel producers of Brazil
Companies based in São Paulo
Alcohol fuel producers
Ethanol fuel
Shell plc
2021 initial public offerings